Antoine Buron (born October 12, 1983) is a French professional footballer currently playing for FC Dieppe. He previously played in Ligue 2 for Amiens and in Ligue 1 for Lorient.

References

1983 births
Living people
French footballers
Amiens SC players
FC Lorient players
FC Dieppe players
Ligue 1 players
Ligue 2 players
Footballers from Rouen
Association football midfielders